San Carlos, also known as Puerto San Carlos, is a fishing community facing the Pacific Ocean, in Magdalena Bay of Baja California Sur, Mexico.  It is located in Comondú Municipality and had a 2010 census population of 5,538.

References

Comondú Municipality
Populated places in Baja California Sur